Little White Lies is a 1996 Australian thriller film. It was shot from 20 November 1995 to 16 February 1996 in Brisbane.

References

External links

1999 films
Australian television films
1990s thriller films
1990s English-language films